Murray Bay may refer to:
 La Malbaie, a municipality in Quebec formerly known as Murray Bay
 Algoma Provider, a Canadian lake freighter originally known as Murray Bay